Hawks PDX is a gay bathhouse located in the Buckman neighborhood of Portland, Oregon, United States.

Description and history
Hawks PDX hosted an anniversary celebration event in April 2013. The bathhouse hosts bear nights and gender-fluid nights. In 2013, PQ Monthly was informed by Hawks' manager that membership is open to all male-identified people. Writing for Willamette Week, contributor Jack Rushall described Hawks as "Grindr IRL" (a real life version of Grindr), and "the dive bar bathhouse that feels much more like you're at somebody's house than an upscale gym".

Hawks PDX is one of only two bathhouses in Portland, as of 2018.

Hawks closed temporarily during the COVID-19 pandemic. The club's website said, "Our landlord did not give us any rent concessions through the pandemic and the amount of rent due through July was just too much. This, combined with the pandemic closure, pointed to permanently shutting down the SE Grand location." Hawks plans to re-open near Mall 205 in 2022.

See also
 Sex clubs in Portland, Oregon

References

External links

 
 

2010s establishments in Oregon
Buckman, Portland, Oregon
Gay bathhouses in Oregon
LGBT culture in Portland, Oregon